Bokaro Thermal Power Station B (BTPS - B) is located at Bokaro district in Jharkhand, 44 km from the Bokaro Steel City and is about 55 km from Dhanbad city.. The nearest railway station is Bokaro Thermal. The power plant is one of the coal based power plants of DVC.

Geography

Location

Area overview
Bokaro district consists of undulating uplands on the Chota Nagpur Plateau with the Damodar River cutting a valley right across. The East Bokaro Coalfield located in the Bermo-Phusro area and small intrusions of Jharia Coalfield make Bokaro a coal rich district. In 1965, one of the largest steel manufacturing units in the country, Bokaro Steel Plant, operated by Steel Authority of India Limited, was set-up at Bokaro Steel City. The Damodar Valley Corporation established its first thermal power station at Bokaro (Thermal). The soil is generally infertile and agriculture is mostly rain-fed.

Note: The map alongside presents some of the notable locations in the district. All places marked in the map are linked in the larger full screen map.

Power plant

Bokaro Thermal Power Station B has an installed capacity of 630 MW. The First unit was commissioned in March 1986. The station is located on the banks of the Konar River near Bokaro ‘A’ Thermal Power Station.  Entire power generated by the plant is supplied to DVC network.

The now defunct Bokaro ‘A’ Thermal Power Station which was the first thermal power plant of the DVC system (commissioned in 1963), was scrapped. In place of which, one 500 MW unit has been commissioned by BHEL in May 2016.

Installed capacity

The boilers are of ABL make, while the turbines and generators are of BHEL make.

See also 

 Chandrapura Thermal Power Station
 Durgapur Thermal Power Station
 Mejia Thermal Power Station

References 

Coal-fired power stations in Jharkhand
Bokaro district
1986 establishments in Bihar
Energy infrastructure completed in 1986